Zwangendaba kaZiguda Jele Gumbi (c. 1785 – 1848) was the king of the Ngoni people for more than thirty years, from approximately 1815 to his death in 1848. He was the older brother of Somkhanda kaZiguda Jele who was also known as Gumbi and founded the Gumbi clan in Kwazulu-Natal in areas of Pongola. Zwangendaba was a King of a clan of the Nguni or Mungoni people who broke away from the Ndwandwe Kingdom alliance under King Zwide. He was related to Zulu king Shaka and served under him as a military commander. After a dispute with Shaka over the payment of tribute from raids undertaken by Zwangendaba on Shaka's behalf, Zwangendaba gathered his clan and fled from the control from the Zulus during the Mfecane, which he was partly responsible for. Zwangendaba led his people, then called the "Jele", on a wandering migration of more than  lasting more than twenty years. Their journey took them through the areas of what is now northern South Africa, Mozambique, Zimbabwe, Zambia and Malawi to the western part of Tanzania, where Zwangendaba set up a base at Mapupo. The Ngoni, originally a small royal clan that left Kwa-Zulu Natal, extended their dominion even further through present-day Tanzania, Malawi, and Zambia when they fragmented into five separate groups following his death. 

Using many of Shaka's warfare methods of rule such as rigid discipline in military and social organisation, he knitted his nation and the people conquered along the way into a cohesive unit. With his people he migrated north into tropical Africa. The migration proceeded across the Zambezi in 1835 on a day when there was a total eclipse of the sun. King Zwangendaba was credited with practising Nguni esoteric knowledge and occult science, and thus on reaching the Zambezi, the waters of the river were reputed to have parted and opened to make way for him and his people (this has been likened to the parting of The Red Sea). Advancing north, ravaging the countries they crossed, they eventually arrived in the south west of what is now Tanzania. On the death of Zwangendaba in 1848, the Ngoni split into three groups, one main group settling in Malawi, one in Songea (Tanzania) and a third group migrated north to Mbogwe in Usumbwa where they fought with the famous Mirambo of Unyamwezi.

External sources
Capsule account of Zwangendaba migration

1780s births
1848 deaths
19th-century monarchs in Africa
History of KwaZulu-Natal
Mfecane